ONE National Gay and Lesbian Archives at the University of Southern California Libraries is the oldest existing lesbian, gay, bisexual, and transgender (LGBT) organization in the United States and one of the largest repositories of LGBT materials in the world. Located in Los Angeles, California, ONE Archives has been a part of the University of Southern California Libraries since 2010. ONE Archives' collections contain over two million items including periodicals; books; film, video and audio recordings; photographs; artworks; ephemera, such as clothing, costumes, and buttons; organizational records; and personal papers. ONE Archives also operates a small gallery and museum space devoted to LGBT art and history in West Hollywood, California. Use of the collections is free during regular business hours.

ONE Archives originated from ONE, Inc., which began publishing the earliest national homosexual publication in 1952. In 1956, ONE Inc. created the ONE Institute, an academic institute for the study of homosexuality, utilizing the term "Homophile Studies". In 1994, ONE, Inc. and the International Gay and Lesbian Archives run by Jim Kepner merged. Since 1994 the organization has operated solely as an LGBT archive.

Mission
ONE Archives' mission statement reads as follows: "It is the mission of ONE National Gay & Lesbian Archives at the USC Libraries to collect, preserve, and make accessible LGBTQ historical materials while promoting new scholarship on and public awareness of queer histories."

History
ONE, Inc. was founded in 1952 to publish the nation's first wide-circulated, national homosexual periodical, ONE Magazine. In 1953, ONE Inc. became the first gay organization to open a public office in Downtown Los Angeles. The original founders include Martin Block, Tony Sanchez (aka Tony Reyes), and Dale Jennings. The corporation's original core members included Martin Block, Tony Reyes, Dale Jennings, Guy Rousseau, Merton Bird, Don Slater, William Lambert (aka W. Dorr Legg), Eve Elloree (aka Joan Corbin), and Ann Carll Reid (aka Irma "Corky" Wolf).

In 1955, ONE Inc. held the ONE Midwinter Institute, the first in a series of conferences to bring together experts and community members to talk about gay and lesbian topics.

In 1956, ONE Inc. created the ONE Institute, an academic institute for the study of homosexuality under the name of "Homophile Studies".

In 1957, marking the first time the Supreme Court of the United States explicitly ruled on homosexuality, ONE Inc. fought to distribute its magazine by mail, and prevailed. The ruling in the case, One, Inc. v. Olesen, not only allowed ONE to distribute its magazine, but also paved the way for other controversial publications to be sent through the U.S. mail.

Also during the 1950s ONE Inc. became an ad hoc community center and began a library. Jim Kepner was involved in adding material to this library.

As the burgeoning gay liberation movement took off and became more closely intertwined with the movements for civil rights of the 1960s and 1970s, ONE Inc., Jim Kepner and a growing group of activists were poised to collect original materials from that critical time period.  By the late 1970s and early 1980s, ONE obtained crucial documents chronicling the establishment of the "gay community" and its established and increasingly diverse groups and organizations.

Since the 1980s, the archival collections have grown substantially as gay issues and gay culture became more integrated into the mainstream culture of the United States.

In October 2012 ONE National Gay & Lesbian Archives celebrated the 60th anniversary of its founding and the printing of ONE Magazine.

Organizational timeline
The institutional history of ONE reveals a set of complex, overlapping and groundbreaking activities that provided a wide variety of pioneering services to LGBT Americans:
 October 1952: The idea of a magazine for homosexuals is first discussed in a Mattachine Society meeting.
 November 1952: ONE, Inc. is founded.
 January 1953: The first issue of ONE Magazine is published.
 August/September 1953: The Los Angeles postal authorities seize the August edition of ONE Magazine. The issue, which bore the title "Homosexual Marriage?" on the cover, is released three weeks later without explanation.
 November 1953: ONE Inc. opens an office in downtown Los Angeles at 232 South Hill Street.
 October 1954: The Los Angeles postal authorities seize the October issues of ONE Magazine on charges of obscenity.
 1956: The ONE Institute for Homophile Studies opens.
 January 13, 1958: After four years of litigation, the Supreme Court declares ONE Magazine is not in violation of obscenity laws.
 1962: ONE Inc. moves to 2256 Venice Boulevard.
 1967: ONE Magazine ceases publication.
 1975: Jim Kepner's personal archive is named the Western Gay Archives.
 1979: The Western Gay Archives is renamed the National Gay Archives: Natalie Barney/Edward Carpenter Library and moves to 1654 North Hudson Avenue in Hollywood.
 August 1981: ONE Institute becomes the first institution of higher learning in the United States to offer masters and doctoral degrees in Homophile Studies.
 1983: ONE Inc. moves into the Milbank Estate at 3340 Country Club Drive purchased by philanthropist Reed Erickson. Soon after, for reasons uncertain, Erickson seeks to have ONE removed from the estate.
 1984: The National Gay Archives is renamed the International Gay & Lesbian Archives (IGLA).
 1988: IGLA moves to a space owned by the City of West Hollywood at 626 North Robertson Boulevard (the current location of the ONE Archives Gallery & Museum).
 1994: W. Dorr Legg dies. ONE Inc. merges with the IGLA and becomes primarily an LGBTQ archive; the organization refers to itself as ONE Institute and ONE Institute/IGLA.
 1997: Jim Kepner dies.
 2000: ONE Institute/IGLA moves to its current location at 909 West Adams Boulevard provided by the University of Southern California.
 2004: The organization is renamed ONE National Gay & Lesbian Archives.
 October 2010: The collections at ONE Archives become a part of the USC Libraries.

Collections
The collections at ONE Archives are primarily national in scope, with special focus on LGBT histories in the Los Angeles region. The archives also include a number of international materials, such as archival records and rare publications.

Archival collections 

ONE houses over 600 archival collections of personal papers from activists, artists and ordinary citizens, as well as records from LGBTQ political, social, educational and cultural organizations. The collections include a wide array of materials such as manuscripts, photographs, letters, graphics, and other historically significant materials.

Important archival collections of note include:

Books and periodicals 

ONE's main library collection comprises over 33,000 volumes of books and monographs; as well as over 13,000 titles of periodicals, such as magazines, newspapers, and newsletters. From issues of the earliest American LGBT publications to the most recent LGBT titles, the collection includes many rare and unusual titles, some of which may be the only copies in existence. The library also includes foreign publications in more than 40 different languages.

Audiovisual 

ONE's collection of audiovisual materials includes over 4,000 films, 21,000 videos (including 10 years of recorded lectures from ONE, Inc.), and 3,000 audio recordings.  Many of ONE's films and videos are stored and preserved in conjunction with the Outfest Legacy Project at the UCLA Film and Television Archive.

Art and photography 

ONE Archives' art collection include over 4,000 paintings, drawings, works on paper, photographs, and sculptural objects, the majority of which date from the 1940s to the present.

Posters, textiles, and objects 

ONE Archives also collects and houses over 3,500 posters; textiles, such as T-shirts, banners and flags; and memorabilia such as buttons, matchbooks, dolls and other three-dimensional objects.

ONE Archives Gallery & Museum, West Hollywood

Since 2008, ONE Archives has operated an exhibition space in West Hollywood, California dedicated to presenting temporary exhibitions on LGBT art and history. The gallery is located in a city owned building that also houses the June L. Mazer Lesbian Archives.

In 2011, ONE Archives participated in the region-wide Pacific Standard Time: Art in L.A., 1945-1980 initiative with the exhibition Cruising the Archive: Queer Art & Culture in Los Angeles, 1945-1980 which was presented at the ONE Gallery in West Hollywood, as well as at ONE Archives' main location on West Adams Boulevard and in the Treasure Room at the Doheny Library at the University of Southern California Libraries. The exhibition included works by Steven F. Arnold, Don Bachardy, Claire Falkenstein, Anthony Friedkin, Rudi Gernreich, Sister Corita Kent, and Kate Millett, among many other less known or anonymous artists. The only exhibition dedicated to queer content within the PST initiative, this exhibition marked the most comprehensive exhibition of materials from the collections at ONE Archives to date and was accompanied by a scholarly catalogue. The publication included contributions by Ann Cvetkovich, Vaginal Davis, Jennifer Doyle, Jack Halberstam, Catherine Lord, Richard Meyer, Ulrike Müller, and Dean Spade.

The ONE Gallery has presented solo exhibitions of artwork by Steven F. Arnold and Joey Terrill, exhibitions of historical materials from the collections at ONE, and highlights from the collections of the Tom of Finland Foundation and the Center for the Study of Political Graphics.

See also

Mattachine Society
LGBT history
LGBT culture in Los Angeles
IHLIA LGBT Heritage in Amsterdam, the Netherlands

References

External links
 

Archives in the United States
LGBT museums and archives
Museums in Los Angeles
History museums in California
LGBT culture in Los Angeles
LGBT history in California
LGBT organizations in the United States
University of Southern California
1952 establishments in California